Richard Findlater (1921–1985) was a British theatre critic and biographer.

Early life
He was born Kenneth Bruce Findlater Bain, but worked under the pen-name Richard Findlater.

Career
Findlater was arts editor for The Observer, and became assistant editor in 1963.

He wrote 18 books, including biographies of Michael Redgrave, Peggy Ashcroft, Laurence Olivier, Ralph Richardson, Lillian Baylis and Joseph Grimaldi; the definitive history of stage censorship, Banned; and an account of contemporary British theatre, The Unholy Trade.

Publications
 Grimaldi: King of Clowns, 1955.
 Michael Redgrave, Mask or Face, 1958
 Memoirs of Joseph Grimaldi, MacGibbon & Kee, 1968
 Comic Cuts: A Bedside Sampler Of Censorship In Action Richard Findlater (ed) (Andre Deutsch, 1970) (illustrated by Willie Rushton)
 At the Royal Court: 25 Years of the English Stage Company, Amber Lane Press (1981);

Personal life
From 1948 to 1962, he was married to the journalist and showbusiness interviewer Romany Bain, with whom he had four children. One of their sons became an Anglican priest-clown known as Roly Bain or "Holy Roly". Their eldest son, Simon Bain, is a journalist. Romany Bain subsequently married jazz bandleader Tommy Watt, with whom she had a son, the musician Ben Watt.  Richard married Angela Colbert in 1977. At his memorial service in 1985, Michael Foot and Sir John Gielgud led the tributes.

References

1921 births
1985 deaths
British biographers
British theatre critics
People educated at Archbishop Tenison's Church of England School, Lambeth
20th-century British journalists
Presidents of the Critics' Circle